Club Deportivo Cultural Huracán (sometimes referred as Cultural Huracán) is a Peruvian football club, playing in the city of Huanta, Ayacucho, Peru.

History
The Club Deportivo Cultural Huracán was founded on September 4, 1944.

In 2010 Copa Perú, the club classified to the Provincial Stage, but was eliminated by Sport Contreras and Deportivo Municipal (Iguain).

In 2011 Copa Perú, the club classified to the Departamental Stage, but was eliminated by Sport Huracán in the Third Stage.

In 2013 Copa Perú, the club classified to the Provincial Stage, but was eliminated by Sport Huanta, Deportivo Municipal (Santillana) and Deportivo Municipal (Iguain).

Honours

Regional
Liga Departamental de Ayacucho:
Winners (1): 2022

Liga Provincial de Huanta:
Winners (2): 2011, 2022

Liga Distrital de Huanta:
Winners (1): 2022

See also
List of football clubs in Peru
Peruvian football league system

References

External links
 

Football clubs in Peru
Association football clubs established in 1944
1944 establishments in Peru